Cassia flower bud salad (also known as mezali phu thoke) is a festive Burmese salad traditionally served during the full moon day of Tazaungmon, often as an satuditha offering. 

The salad's base ingredients includes freshly picked Siamese cassia flower buds, boiled potatoes, sliced onions, peanuts, sesame seed, garlic, seasoned with salt, oil, sesame seeds, and lemon juice.

A common Burmese tradition during the full moon day of Tazaungmon is for families to pick Siamese cassia flower buds and prepare the buds, either as a salad or a soup. The flower buds are considered to have curative medicinal properties.

References

See also
Tazaungmon

Burmese cuisine